Alain Daniélou (4 October 1907 – 27 January 1994) was a French historian, Indologist, intellectual, musicologist, translator, writer, and notable Western convert to and expert on the Shaivite sect of Hinduism.

In 1991 he was awarded the Sangeet Natak Akademi Fellowship, the highest honour conferred by Sangeet Natak Akademi, India's National Academy for Music, Dance and Drama.

Early life and education
His mother, Madeleine Clamorgan, was from an old family of the Norman nobility; a fervent Roman Catholic, she founded schools and a religious order, the Order of Sainte-Marie, for women teachers in civilian costume under the patronage of St. François-Xavier. His father, Charles Daniélou, was an anti-clerical Breton politician who held numerous national ministerial posts in the Third Republic. One of his brothers was the Roman Catholic prelate and Académie Française member, Jean Daniélou.

He received his education at the Institution Notre-Dame de Sainte-Croix, Neuilly-sur-Seine, and at St. John's College, Annapolis. The young Daniélou studied singing under the famous Charles Panzéra, as well as classical dancing with Nicholas Legat (teacher of Vaslav Nijinsky), and composition with Max d'Ollone. Subsequently, he performed professionally on stage with dancers such as Floria Capsali and Marjorie Daw. Growing up, he rebelled against his mother's deep devotion to her faith, but his father remained a positive influence, which helped in developing his musical talent and in coping with his homosexuality. He studied piano and singing, learning the songs of Duparc and Chausson and the liederkreis of Schumann and Schubert. He started writing poems, as acquired proficiency in English and other European languages.

Career

India: 1932–1960
He and his partner, the Swiss photographer Raymond Burnier, first went to India as part of an adventure trip, and they were fascinated with the art and culture of the nation. Daniélou and Burnier were among the first Westerners to visit India's famed erotic Hindu temples in the village of Khajuraho and Burnier's stunning photographs of the ancient temple complex launched the site internationally. The photographs were featured in an exhibition at the New York's Metropolitan Museum.

In 1932, during his first trip to India, he met one of the great influences poet Rabindranath Tagore. His close association with Tagore lead him to become the director of Tagore's school of music at Shantiniketan (Visva-Bharati University). Subsequently, in 1935, he joined the Banaras Hindu University, where he studied Hindu music, Sanskrit language and literature, Hindu philosophy, and Hindu religion for the next 15 years of his life. In 1949, he was appointed as a research professor at the University, a post he held until 1953; he also remained the director of the College of Indian Music. In Bénarès (now Varanasi), he lived in a mansion on the banks of the Ganges, named Rewa Kothi. During these years, he studied Indian classical music in Bénarès with Shivendranath Basu and played the veena, a classical Indian instrument which he started playing professionally. He also studied Hindi and Sanskrit languages, as well as Indian philosophy.

His interest in the symbolism of Hindu architecture and sculpture lead him to long trips with Burnier to Khajuraho, Bhubaneswar, and Konarak, sites located in central India and Rajasthan. He also translated some works of Swami Karpatri, the samnyasin by whom he was initiated into Shaivism under the Hindu name Shiva Sharan ("Protected by Shiva"). In 1942, he published his translation of the Tirukkural, a Tamil moral literature.

In 1953, he joined the Adyar Library and Research Centre at the Theosophical Society Adyar near Madras (now Chennai), where he was the director of a centre of research into Sanskrit literature until 1956. In 1959, he became a member of French Institute of Pondicherry, which works in the field of Indology.

Europe: 1960 onwards
Upon his return to Europe in 1960, he was appointed an advisor to the UNESCO's International Music Council, which led to a number of recordings of traditional music such as Unesco Collection: A Musical Anthology of the Orient, Musical Atlas, Musical Sources, and Anthology of Indian Classical Music - A Tribute to Alain Daniélou. In 1963, he became the founder and director of the International Institute for Comparative Music Studies and Documentation (IICMSD) in West Berlin, where he remained till 1977; he was also the director of the Istituto Internazionale di Musica Comparata (IISMC) in Venice from 1969 to 1979.

He worked on Indian classical music. But his more important contribution to Indology is his writings on the ancient wisdom of the Vedas, Hindu philosophy, and Shaivism.

He is the author of over thirty books on Indian music and culture. He received several awards for his work on music. He was also a photographer and artist.

Awards and recognition
Daniélou was an Officer of the Légion d'Honneur, an Officer of the Ordre National du Mérite, and Commander of Arts and Letters. He was the director of the UNESCO Collection series, a series of recordings of traditional world music.  In 1981, Daniélou received the UNESCO/CIM prize for music, and, in 1987 the Kathmandu Medal from UNESCO.

Legacy
In 2004, to mark his tenth death anniversary a photo exhibition, "India through the eyes of Alain Danielou (1935-1955)" was hosted at the Alliance Française, Hyderabad.

Works 
 While the Gods play, Shaiva Oracles and Predictions on the Cycles of History and  Destiny of Mankind (1985)
 Gods of Love and Ecstasy, The Tradition of Shiva & Dionysus, Omnipresent Gods of Transcendence
 The Hindu Temple; Deification of Eroticism
 Music and the Power of Sound
 A Brief History of Indiapublished by Inner Traditions
 The complete Kâma Sûtra The first unabridged translation.
 Virtue, success, pleasure & liberation: the four aims of life in the tradition of ancient India
 Ragas of North Indian Classical Music
 The Way to the Labyrinth: An Autobiography published by New Directions.
 The Myths and Gods of India, Hindu Polytheism
 Yoga: the Method of Reintegration
 Yoga, Mastering the Secrets of Matter and the Universe
 Fools of God
 Song-poems - Rabindranath Tagore, Texts in English, French and Bengali & Melodies
 The Congress of the World With miniatures of tantric cosmology
 Sacred Music, its Origins, Powers and Future, Traditional Music in Today's World
 The Situation Of Music And Musicians In The Countries Of The Orient
 Introduction to The Study of Musical Scales
 Northern Indian Music: Vol. One, Theory, History and Technique
 Northern Indian Music: Vol. Two, The Main Ragas
 The Phallus, Sacred Symbol of Male Creative Power
 India, a civilization of differences: the ancient tradition of universal tolerance
 Shiva And The Primordial Tradition: From the Tantras to the Science of Dreams
 Manimekhalaï, The Dancer With The Magic Bowl Translation by Alain Daniélou
 Shilappadikâram, The Ankle Bracelet
 Sacred Music, Its Origins, Powers And Future
 A Descriptive Catalogue Of Sanskrit Manuscripts in Alain Daniélou’s Collection at the Giorgio Cini Foundation

Discography 
 Unesco Collection: A Musical Anthology of the Orient
 Anthology of Indian Classical Music - A Tribute to Alain Daniélou
 Musiciens et Danseurs de la caste des Ahirs (1951)
 Religious Music of India (1952)
 Musical Atlas
 Musical Sources (Philips, Holland)
 Anthology of North Indian Classical Music - (Bärenreiter-Musicaphon, Kassel)

Filmography 
 2017: Alain Daniélou - The Way to the Labyrinth, a documentary by Riccardo Biadene, KAMA Productions.

See also 

 Michel Danino
 Jean Filliozat
 Francois Gautier
 Louis Renou
 Tirukkural translations into French

References

External links 

 The Way to the Labyrinth: An Autobiography by Alain Danielou
 Official web site of Alain Danielou (English)
 Article on Daniélou
 Exhibition catalogue of Khajuraho photographs, Metropolitan Museaum of Art 

1907 births
1994 deaths
20th-century French historians
20th-century French male writers
20th-century French musicologists
20th-century French philosophers
20th-century French translators
20th-century Hindu philosophers and theologians
Academic staff of Banaras Hindu University
Breton musicians
Commandeurs of the Ordre des Arts et des Lettres
Converts to Hinduism from Christianity
Former Roman Catholics
French expatriates in India
French expatriates in Switzerland
French former Christians
French gay writers
French Hindus
French historians of philosophy
French historians of religion
French Indologists
Hindu studies scholars
Historians of India
Historians of South Asia
Indian musicologists
LGBT Hindus
Matriarchy
People from Neuilly-sur-Seine
Recipients of the Legion of Honour
Recipients of the Ordre national du Mérite
Recipients of the Sangeet Natak Akademi Fellowship
Sanskrit–English translators
Shaivites
Tamil–French translators
Tirukkural translators
Translators of the Tirukkural into French
Academic staff of Visva-Bharati University
Winners of the Prix Broquette-Gonin (literature)